Gastón Germán González (born 23 February 1988) is an Argentine professional footballer who plays as a midfielder for Deportivo Morón.

Career
González's opening club became Primera B Nacional side Platense in 2008, with the midfielder appearing in two fixtures for the club. In 2011, González completed a move to Platanias of the Greek Football League. He made his debut during a win away to Panachaiki on 30 October, before netting his first senior goal in the following April against Fokikos. The 2011–12 season concluded with promotion to Superleague Greece, in which he made nineteen appearances. González returned to the Football League with Episkopi in 2013. Ten goals soon followed, including braces against Iraklis Psachna, Panegialios and Glyfada.

Moves to Apollon Smyrni and Chania subsequently arrived between July 2014 and June 2015, at which time González sealed a move to fellow second tier outfit Trikala. After scoring twice in thirteen games, he was sent off in his last match on 6 December versus Acharnaikos. González went back to Argentina in January 2016, joining Primera B Nacional's Independiente Rivadavia. He played in a total of seventy-seven fixtures and scored nine across three seasons with the Mendoza club. On 30 June 2018, Deportivo Morón signed González. His first appearance came in a Copa Argentina tie with top-flight Colón on 21 July.

Career statistics
.

References

External links

1988 births
Living people
Sportspeople from Lanús
Argentine footballers
Association football midfielders
Argentine expatriate footballers
Expatriate footballers in Greece
Argentine expatriate sportspeople in Greece
Primera Nacional players
Football League (Greece) players
Super League Greece players
Club Atlético Platense footballers
Platanias F.C. players
Episkopi F.C. players
Apollon Smyrnis F.C. players
AO Chania F.C. players
Trikala F.C. players
Independiente Rivadavia footballers
Deportivo Morón footballers